The linear transform model refers to a fundamental assumption guiding the analysis of functional Magnetic Resonance Imaging (fMRI) studies.  Specifically, the model holds that the fMRI signal is approximately proportional to a measure of local neural activity, averaged over a spatial extent of several millimeters and over a time period of several seconds.

Debate 
The linear transform model is a common and widespread assumption used in the interpretation of fMRI studies.  However, some scientists suggest reasons exist to remain sceptical. Heeger and Ress, in a review of fMRI and its relation to neuronal activity, argue that it is a reasonable and useful approximation for local neural activity "for some recording sites, in some brain areas, using certain experimental protocols", but it is not under other circumstances.

See also 
 Functional magnetic resonance imaging

References

Magnetic resonance imaging
Neuroimaging